Phyllidia koehleri is a species of sea slug, a dorid nudibranch, a shell-less marine gastropod mollusk in the family Phyllidiidae.

Distribution 
This species was described from the Maldives.

Description
This nudibranch has an orange coloured dorsum with three longitudinal black lines. The outer lines continue across the front of the head and around the back of the mantle, forming a complete ring. There are longitudinal ridges along the back and the rhinophores are orange-yellow. There are also animals with the same coloration but a pattern of radiating black lines on the outer part of the mantle and conspicuous tubercles. This is probably a different species.

Diet
This species feeds on a red sponge.

References

Phyllidiidae
Gastropods described in 2000